Young Frank Freeman (14 December 1890 – 5 February 1969) was studio head at Paramount Pictures from 1938 to 1959. Freeman was born in Greenville, Georgia, and graduated from the Georgia Institute of Technology in 1910. In addition to his work with Paramount, he also worked in the fields of banking, higher education, and athletics.

He joined S.A. Lynch Theatrical Enterprises in Atlanta who later were acquired by Paramount. He rose through Paramount's ranks and moved to Hollywood in 1932. In 1935, he was elected vice president in charge of theater operations and by 1938 he had been named vice president in charge of studio operations. He remained in this role until 1959. He retired from Paramount in 1967.

He was president of the Association of Motion Picture Producers from 1940 to 1944 and chairman in 1947–48.

He was the first winner of the Jean Hersholt Humanitarian Award in 1957, for his charitable work.  He was awarded a star on the Hollywood Walk of Fame on February 8, 1960. 

He was also chairman of LA Bureau of the Federal Reserve Board from 1944 to 1947 and deputy chairman in San Francisco in 1954–55. Freeman supported Thomas Dewey in the 1944 United States presidential election.

He died in California and was buried at Westview Cemetery in Atlanta.

He was married to Margaret and their son, Y. Frank Freeman Jr. was a movie producer who died in 1962.

References

Notes

Sources
 
 
 

1890 births
1969 deaths
Georgia Tech alumni
American film studio executives
Paramount Pictures executives
Jean Hersholt Humanitarian Award winners
Academy Honorary Award recipients